The Kasi Visalakshi Viswanathar temple is in the village of Kunnuvarankottai. This village is served by three rivers — Vaigai, Maruda and Manjalaru — called the Triveni Sangam (tri = three, veni = river, sangam = confluence). The river Vaigai takes a slightly northern course (Tamil: உத்தரவாஹினீ) near this village, like the Ganges takes at Varanasi.

Kunnuvarankottai
Kunnuvarankottai is a village near Batlagundu which is on the foothills of Kodaikanal in Dindigul district. The Tamil name for this village is Kundru-Aran-Kottai which now is known as Kunnuvarankottai or Kannapatti.

Kasi Visalakshi Viswanathar temple

Villagers believe that bathing in the confluence during holy days like Amavasya will enable the devotees to realise the purpose of life. There is a 300-year-old Visalakshi Viswanathar temple in the village by the riverside. The presiding deities are Goddess Visalakshi and God Viswanathar. It is similar in nature to the Kasi Visalakshi Viswanathar temple in many respects. The shrine for the Goddess Visalakshi faces south in this temple.  As per the temple legend, the locals say that this idol was brought by a devotee from Kasi or Varanasi.
There are other shrines for Lord Dakshinamoorthy, Bhairava, and Hanuman also.

The Kumbhabishekam of this temple was completed in 2001. In January 2013, the Punaruddharana Kumbhabishekam of this temple was completed. Shri K. V. Vishwanathan Sivachariyar is the priest. The temple conducts many festivals every year including Sivarathri (பிரதோஷம், சங்கடஹர சதுர்த்தி, சஷ்டி, நவராத்திரி).

Special feature
Sri Sacchidananda Bharati I (1623–1663) the 25th acharya of Sringeri Sharada Peetham was born in this area and the annual birthday is celebrated in this temple every year in Sravana month Rohini star. A Dhyana mandapam in the memory of this saint is in this village near the Vaigai River.
It is pertinent to note that the current and the previous pontiff of Sringeri Sarada Peetam Sri Sri Sri Abhinava Vidyatirtha Swamigal visited this temple in 1965 and Sri Sri Bharathi Teertha Swamigal have graced this temple twice till date respectively. (Last visit was on 2 June 2012)

With the blessings and benevolence of Sri Sri Bharathi Teertha Swamigal, the Kumbhabhishekam of this temple was completed in January 2013 and a mandapam was constructed in front of Lord Sri Dakshinamoorthy shrine in this temple with the help of  devotees.

Sri Sri Vidhusekhara Bharathi Swamigal visited this village during his visit to the town of Batlagundu in April 2017.

References

External links

 (29-8-2010, P.7). "Kunnuvarankottayil Sacchidananda Bharathi Jayanthi", குன்னுவாரங்கோட்டையில் சச்சிதாநந்த பாரதீ ஜயந்தி, Dinamalar Tamil daily newspaper, Madurai and Dindigul editions.
 Pandit Re. Ramamurthy and Vidwan Ra. Arangakrishnan. (February 2010. P. 11). "Sri Ramakrishna Paramahamsar Aruliya Inkadhai Kavidai', Saravana Padippagam, Chinmaya Nagar, Chennai-600 092, Collection of Tamil poems and short stories.
 R. Venkataramani. (August 2003. P. 8,9,10,11,12,13). "Sringeri Sarada Peedathin 25th Peetadhipadhi - Mudalam Sachchidananda Bharathi", 'Amman Darisanam', Tamil periodical.
 R. Gopalaiyer. (26-1-2001). Kunnuvarankottai Shri Visalakshi Visvesvarar Thiruchadakam, Kasturi Press, Thirumangalam.
 http://www.sringeri.net/branches/tamil-nadu/vattalagundu - Link to Vattalagundu and Kunnuvarankottai related to Sringeri Mutt branch
 http://vijayayatra.sringeri.net/ - Website covering the Vijaya Yatra of Sri Sri Bharathi Teertha Swamigal in 2012

 https://web.archive.org/web/20130506071522/http://vijayayatra.sringeri.net/vathalagundu-june-1-2012/ - Visit to Kunnuvarankottai and Vathalagundu on 1, 2 June 2012 of the current pontiff which contains the photographs also
 https://web.archive.org/web/20130228023700/http://vijayayatra.sringeri.net/madurai-may-21-2012/ - Visit to Madurai of the current pontiff of Sringeri Sarada Peetam in 2012 and release of the book on "Meenakshi Shatakam" in Madurai by His Holiness.
 (13-10-2013). "Sri Viswanathar Temple", Dinamalar Tamil daily newspaper, - http://temple.dinamalar.com/en/new_en.php?id=1145 -Website covering the features of this temple on the Vijayadasami day.
 (15-01-2016). "Kunnuvarankottaiyil 13th Century Tollgate", Dinamalar Tamil daily newspaper, http://www.dinamalar.com/supplementary_detail.asp?id=28648&ncat=12.

see KVV_Subrahmanyam

Hindu temples in Dindigul district
Shiva temples in Tamil Nadu
Sringeri Sharada Peetham